Eoophyla interopalis is a moth in the family Crambidae. It was described by David John Lawrence Agassiz in 2012. It is found in Malawi, Mozambique, South Africa, Tanzania, Zambia and Zimbabwe.

The wingspan is 10–14 mm. The forewings are white, but dark fuscous at the base, partly suffused with dull orange. There is an orange antemedian fascia and the median area is scattered with dark fuscous scales. The base of the hindwings is white, with a dark fuscous subbasal band. There is a scattering of dark fuscous scales on the median area. Adults have been recorded on wing from November to May.

Etymology
The species name refers to the white marking between eyespots three and four.

References

Eoophyla
Moths described in 2012